The 2013 UNLV Rebels football team represented the University of Nevada, Las Vegas during the 2013 NCAA Division I FBS football season. The Rebels were led by fourth year head coach Bobby Hauck and played their home games at Sam Boyd Stadium. They were members of the West Division of the Mountain West Conference. This was the first season since 2000 where UNLV went to a bowl game, and as of 2021, is the last.

Schedule

Game summaries

at Minnesota

In their first game of the season, the Rebels lost, 51–23 to the Minnesota Golden Gophers.

Arizona

In their second game of the season, the Rebels lost, 58–13 to the Arizona Wildcats.

Central Michigan

In their third game of the season, the Rebels won, 31–21 over the Central Michigan Chippewas.

Western Illinois

In their fourth game of the season, the Rebels won, 38–7 over the Western Illinois Leathernecks.

at New Mexico

In their fifth game of the season, the Rebels won, 56–42 over the New Mexico Lobos.

Hawaii

In their sixth game of the season, the Rebels won, 39–37 over the Hawaii Rainbow Warriors.

at Fresno State

In their seventh game of the season, the Rebels lost, 38–14 to the Fresno State Bulldogs.

at Nevada

In their eighth game of the season, the Rebels won, 27–22 over the Nevada Wolf Pack.

San Jose State

In their ninth game of the season, the Rebels lost, 34–24 to the San Jose State Spartans.

Utah State

In their tenth game of the season, the Rebels lost, 28–24 to the Utah State Aggies.

at Air Force

In their eleventh game of the season, the Rebels won, 41–21 over the Air Force Falcons to become bowl eligible for the first time since the year 2000.

San Diego State

In their twelfth game of the season, the Rebels won, 45–19 over the San Diego State Aztecs.

vs. North Texas (Heart of Dallas Bowl)

In their thirteenth game of the season, the Rebels lost, 36–14 to the North Texas Mean Green in the 2014 Heart of Dallas Bowl in Dallas, Texas.

Weekly starters
The following players were the weekly offensive and defensive game starters.

References

UNLV
UNLV Rebels football seasons
UNLV Rebels football